State leaders in the 16th century BC – State leaders in the 14th century BC – State leaders by year
This is a list of state leaders in the 15th century BC (1500–1401 BC).

Africa: Northeast

Egypt: New Kingdom

Eighteenth Dynasty of the New Kingdom (complete list) –
Thutmose I, King (1506–1493 BC)
Thutmose II, King (1493–1479 BC)
Thutmose III, King (1479–1425 BC)
Hatshepsut, Queen (1479–1458 BC)
Amenhotep II, King (1425–1398 BC)

Asia

Asia: East

China

Shang, China (complete list) –
Tai Wu, King (c.1546–1471 BC)
Yong Ji, King (c.1471–1459 BC)
Zhong Ding, King (c.1459–1448 BC)
Wai Ren, King (c.1448–1433 BC)
He Dan Jia, King (c.1433–1424 BC)
Zu Yi, King (c.1424–1405 BC)
Zu Xin, King (c.1405–1389 BC)

Asia: Southeast
Vietnam
Hồng Bàng dynasty (complete list) –
Khôn line, (c.1632–c.1431 BC)
Đoài line, (c.1431–c.1332 BC)

Asia: West

Hittite: Old Kingdom, List –
Hantili I, King (c.1526–1496 BC, short chronology)
Zidanta I, King (c.1496–1486 BC, short chronology)
Ammuna, King (c.1486–1466 BC, short chronology)
Huzziya I, King (c.1466–1461 BC, short chronology)
Telepinu, King (c.1430–1400 BC, short chronology)

Hittite: Middle Kingdom, Asia Minor, Ruled c.mid to late 15th century BC —
Alluwamna, King ( 000 )
Tahurwaili, King ( 000 )
Hantili II, King (c.1500–1450 BC, short chronology)
Zidanta II, King ( 000 )
Huzziya II, King ( 000 )
Muwatalli I, King ( 000 )

Mitanni, List –
Kirta, ruler (c.1500 BC, short chronology)
Shuttarna I, ruler ( 000 )
Parshatatar or Parrattarna, ruler ( 000 )
Shaushtatar, Ruler ( 000 ), contemporary of Idrimi of Alalakh
Artatama I, Ruler ( 000 ), contemporary of Pharaohs Thutmose IV and Amenhotep II

Tyre, Phoenecia, List –
Agenor, King (c.1500 BC)

Assyria: Old Assyrian Period, List 
Puzur-Ashur III, King (24 or 14 years), contemporary of Burna-Buriash I of Babylonia
Enlil-nasir I, King (13 years)
Nur-ili, King (12 years)
Ashur-shaduni, King (1 month)
Ashur-rabi I, King ( 000 )
Ashur-nadin-ahhe I, King ( 000 )
Enlil-Nasir II, King (c.1420–1415 BC, short chronology)
Ashur-nirari II, King (c.1414–1408 BC, short chronology)
Ashur-bel-nisheshu, King (c.1407–1399 BC, short chronology)

Sealand Dynasty, rules Sumerian regions south of Babylon, but termed the Second Dynasty of Babylon, List –
Ea-gamil, King (fl. c.1460 BC)

Kassite Dynasty, Third Dynasty of Babylon —
Agum II or Agum-Kakrime
Burnaburiash I, King ( 000 ), treaty with Puzur-Ashur III of Assyria
Kashtiliash III, King ( 000 )
Ulamburiash, King ( 000 )
Agum III, King ( 000 )
Karaindash, King ( 000 )
Kadashman-harbe I, King ( 000 )

Elam (complete list) –
Epartid dynasty
Kutik-Matlat[4], King (c.1500 BC–?)
Kidinuid dynasty
Kidinu, King (15th century BC–?)
Inshushinak-Sunkir-Nappipir, King (?)
Tan-Ruhuratir II, King (15th century BC–?)
Shalla, King (?)

References 

State Leaders
-
15th-century BC rulers